Marques Ogden (born November 15, 1980) is a former American football offensive tackle and center. He had stints with the Jacksonville Jaguars, the Baltimore Ravens, the Buffalo Bills, and the Tennessee Titans until August 2007, when he was cut. He is the brother of Hall of Fame offensive tackle Jonathan Ogden.

Education and early career
Ogden is a 2002 graduate of Howard University with a Bachelor of Science in Finance, with emphasis on construction and cost accounting. He was also part of their NCAA Division I football team. In 2005, he participated in a program through the University of Southern California on project development and construction developed specifically for NFL players hoping to diversify after their football career.

After retirement
After retiring from the NFL, Ogden formed a company called Kayden Premier Enterprises Inc., an earth-moving company based out of Baltimore, Maryland. After going out of business in 2012, he received financial aid from the Gene Upshaw Players Assistance Trust Fund. He has since become a public speaker and has been involved with the National Youth Football Organization in a coach-like role.

Awards

Top 100 MBE Winners through the Center for Business Inclusion and Diversity sponsored by The University of Maryland, Southwest Airlines, and greiBO media (2010)
Winner of the Rising Star Under Age 40 Award from Living Classrooms and Stevenson University (2010)
Selected for Greater Baltimore Committee Leadership Council (2010)
Nominated for the Mayor's Business Recognition Award through the Greater Baltimore Committee Program
Invited to become an honorary member of the Morgan State University Business Honor Program (2010)

References

1980 births
Living people
People from Washington, D.C.
American football offensive tackles
Howard Bison football players
Jacksonville Jaguars players
Baltimore Ravens players
Scottish Claymores players
Reading Express players
Triangle Torch players